Jacob Opdahl (15 January 1894 – 20 March 1938) was a Norwegian gymnast who competed in the 1912 Summer Olympics and in the 1920 Summer Olympics.

In 1912, he was part of the Norwegian team, which won the gold medal in the gymnastics men's team, free system event. Eight years later he won a silver medal again as member of the Norwegian gymnastics team.

He was born and died in Bergen, was a brother of Nils Opdahl, and represented Bergens TF.

References

1894 births
1938 deaths
Norwegian male artistic gymnasts
Gymnasts at the 1912 Summer Olympics
Gymnasts at the 1920 Summer Olympics
Olympic gymnasts of Norway
Olympic gold medalists for Norway
Olympic silver medalists for Norway
Sportspeople from Bergen
Olympic medalists in gymnastics
Medalists at the 1920 Summer Olympics
Medalists at the 1912 Summer Olympics
20th-century Norwegian people